NGC 244 is a lenticular galaxy located in the constellation Cetus. It was discovered on December 30, 1785 by William Herschel.

References

External links
 

0244
Lenticular galaxies
Cetus (constellation)
002675